Triathlon at the 2019 Military World Games was held in Wuhan, China on 27 October 2019.

Medal summary

References 
 2019 Military World Games Results - Page 538

Triathlon
2019
2019